The 1980 ABN World Tennis Tournament was a tennis tournament played on indoor carpet courts at Rotterdam Ahoy in the Netherlands. It was part of the 1980 Volvo Grand Prix circuit. It was the eight edition of the tournament and was held from 10 March through 16 March 1980. Unseeded Heinz Günthardt won the singles title.

Finals

Singles

 Heinz Günthardt defeated  Gene Mayer 6–2, 6–4

Doubles
 Vijay Amritraj /  Stan Smith defeated  Bill Scanlon /  Brian Teacher 6–4, 6–2

References

External links
 Official website 
 Official website 
 ATP tournament profile
 ITF tournament details